Brian Alfred Turner (born 31 July 1949 in England), was a New Zealand football player, who was a prominent squad member during the country's first successful campaign to qualify for the FIFA World Cup, in 1982. He was assistant coach for the New Zealand national team that played in the 2010 FIFA World Cup.

Clubs coached

Turner has served on the coaching staffs of Wellington Phoenix FC, Auckland Manukau United, Onehunga Sports, and Fencibles AFC 2013.

Club career 
Turner was born in England and moved to New Zealand at an early age. He began his senior playing career in New Zealand with Ponsonby and Eden before returning to England in 1968 where he joined Chelsea FC for a season, but failed to make a 1st team appearance. He then moved to Portsmouth FC for a short stint and ultimately to Brentford FC where he spent 2 and a half seasons. Turner returned to New Zealand in 1972 where he spent 8 seasons with Mt Wellington. In 1981 Turner moved to Australia, playing first with Blacktown City then Wollongong Wolves before once again returning to his adopted country to play for Gisborne City, Papatoetoe and Mt Wellington again.

International career
He made his A-International debut in a 3–5 loss against trans-Tasman rival Australia on 5 November 1967 in the 1967 South Vietnam Independence Cup and went on to earn 59 A-international caps in which he scored a credible 21 goals. His international career spanned a then national record 102 appearances in the All White strip including unofficial matches.

Turner was an integral member of the New Zealand side that qualified for the 1982 FIFA World Cup in Spain, playing in all but 3 qualifying matches. However, his only appearance at the finals was as a late substitute in the 0–4 loss to Brazil. It was to be his last game for his adopted country, Turner announcing his international retirement after their elimination following group stage losses against Scotland, USSR and Brazil.

Turner continued to play domestically in New Zealand through his thirties before continuing his football involvement in coaching roles. Brian's achievements earned him three Player of the Year titles, and in 1995 he was inducted into the New Zealand Soccer Hall of Fame

Administration career

In 2013, Turner founded the independent group Friends of Football

Honours

Individual 
New Zealand Player of the Year: 1974, 1979, 1980
NZSMA Hall of Fame: 1995
Friends of Football Medal of Excellence 2015

Club
Mt Wellington
National League: 1972, 1974, 1979, 1980
Chatham Cup: 1973, 1980
Brentford
 Football League Fourth Division third-place promotion: 1971–72

References

External links
 
 
 

1949 births
Living people
New Zealand association footballers
New Zealand people of English descent
New Zealand expatriate sportspeople in England
New Zealand international footballers
English footballers
Association football midfielders
Association football forwards
Mount Albert-Ponsonby players
Three Kings United players
Chelsea F.C. players
Portsmouth F.C. players
Brentford F.C. players
University-Mount Wellington players
Blacktown City FC players
Wollongong Wolves FC players
Gisborne City AFC players
Papatoetoe AFC players
Bay Olympic players
English Football League players
1973 Oceania Cup players
1982 FIFA World Cup players